Gary E. Grant is an American trumpet player, composer and producer, and session musician who has played on hundreds of commercial recordings.

Gary has collaborated with a variety of artists such as Barbra Streisand, Michael Jackson, Whitney Houston, Celine Dion, Toni Braxton, Brian McKnight, Frank Sinatra, Natalie Cole, Earth Wind & Fire, Go West, Take Six, Elton John, and Aerosmith. Additionally, Gary has worked with producers such as David Foster, Glenn Ballard, Dave Grusin, and Baby Face. In addition, he was a guest artist with the "Chicago 17" horns.

Biography 
Gary grew up in a musical family, with his father Harry Grant providing him with early training. He later attended North Texas State University and went on a tour with the Woody Herman band as a lead trumpet player and featured soloist. After spending three years in Hawaii, Gary worked with a talented group of musicians and played with his own big band and 7 piece ensemble.

Gary moved to Los Angeles in 1975 to pursue a career as a full-time musician.

He has also recorded with Quincy Jones on the albums "Back On The Block" and "Q's Juke Joint".

Grant has been a long-time member of the Jerry Hey horn section The Jerry Hey Horns.

References

External links 

 
 
 

Living people
21st-century American male musicians
American male jazz musicians
Year of birth missing (living people)
Seawind (band) members
Lyle Lovett and His Large Band members